Aud Inger Aure (born 12 November 1942) is a Norwegian politician for the Christian Democratic Party. Born in Averøy, Møre og Romsdal, she was awarded a Candidate of Law degree in 1993. From 1989 to 1990 she represented her county in the Storting, while Kjell Magne Bondevik was Minister of Foreign Affairs in the government of Jan P. Syse. On 17 October 1997 she was appointed Minister of Justice and the Police in the first government of Kjell Magne Bondevik.

On 21 January 1999, Aure took a leave of absence due to a minor heart attack, at which point Dagfinn Høybråten took over her duties as acting minister of Justice and the Police. Even though she made a full recovery, Aure eventually gave up on the prospect of returning to her position, and on 15 March she made her absence permanent by resignation. The ministry was taken over by Odd Einar Dørum. After this Aure returned to her position as mayor of Kristiansund, a position she had held also before her appointment to the ministry.

References

1942 births
Living people
People from Averøy
Government ministers of Norway
Members of the Storting
Christian Democratic Party (Norway) politicians
20th-century Norwegian women politicians
20th-century Norwegian politicians
Women government ministers of Norway
Female justice ministers
Ministers of Justice of Norway
20th-century Norwegian women
Women members of the Storting